Miyamayomena is a genus of East Asian flowering plants in the tribe Astereae within the family Asteraceae.

 Species
 Miyamayomena angustifolia (Hand.-Mazz.) Y.L.Chen
 Miyamayomena koraiensis (Nakai) Kitam. - Korea
 Miyamayomena piccolii (Hook.f.) Kitam. - China
 Miyamayomena savatieri (Makino) Kitam. - Japan
 Miyamayomena simplex (Hand.-Mazz.) Y.L.Chen - Sichuan
 Miyamayomena yuanqunensis (J.Q.Fu) J.Q.Fu - Shanxi

References

Asteraceae genera
Astereae
Flora of China
Flora of Eastern Asia